Nigel Peter Albon (born 8 February 1957) is a British race car driver. He last drove in the Porsche Carrera Cup Asia for Team Vertu in 2007. His son, Alex Albon, is also a race car driver, driving in Formula One for Williams F1 Team.

Racing career
In 1993 he raced in the Renault Clio Cup, finishing the year fifth on points. During the 1994 British Touring Car Championship (BTCC) he raced a Renault 19 for Harlow Motorsport in the Total Independents Cup coming equal fifth with 108 points. In 2001 he drove one race of the FIA GT Championship for the Gamon Porsche team. From 2005 he spent the next three years in the Porsche Carrera Cup Asia with a best final points position of fourth in 2007.

His son, Alex, is a Formula 1 driver for Williams Racing, who formerly drove for Red Bull Racing. Alex also formerly finished third in Formula 2 in 2018, and before that been European and World Karting Champion in the KF3 class in 2010.

Racing record

Complete British Touring Car Championship results
(key) (Races in bold indicate pole position) (Races in italics indicate fastest lap)

References

External links
 

1957 births
Living people
British racing drivers
British Touring Car Championship drivers
FIA GT Championship drivers